Haide Delia Giri (born 1952) is a former Argentine Senator for Córdoba Province. She is a member of the Argentine Justicialist Party.

Biography
Giri was born and raised in the city of General Pico, La Pampa Province, She moved to Córdoba during her youth to study at the University. She graduated as a surgeon at the Medical Science Faculty of the National University of Córdoba, a title which was later co-validated by the University of Madrid.

Between the years 1974 and 1976, she served as Under-Secretary of Social Action at the Córdoba City Council. In 1993 she was elected Provincial Senator for the Capital Department and formed an own parliamentary group until the end of her mandate in 1997.

Two years later Giri joined the Ministry of Health of the Province of Córdoba as a Director of Social Action and Director of the Support Unit of the Integral Assistance Program of Córdoba (P.A.I.Cor), dependent to the General Government Secretary. In 2001 she was appointed as the General Director of Medical Attention. This same year she took the position of Health Secretary of the Province and then Health Secretary of the City of Córdoba. In 2002 she was designated as General Secretary for the Government of the Province of Córdoba.

In July 2003, Giri was named President of DACYT until December of that same year, when she was sworn in as National Senator. Since then she has been part of the Front for Victory parliamentary group in support of the President, Cristina Fernández de Kirchner. She was a vice president of the Health and Sport Committee (in charge of the presidency) and a member of the National Defense, Infrastructure, Housing and Transport, Mining, Energy and Fuel, Tourism and Population and Human Development Committees. Her mandate expired on December 10, 2009.

In the Province of Córdoba, Giri is a member of the Women Provincial Council Executive Board. She was also an active member of the Parliamentarian Group of Friendship with the people of Greece. Since the year 2005 she has been a permanent member of the Inter-Parliamentary Union.

Legislative activity

Her legislative activities include:

Law Project regarding Prevention from and Protection Against Domestic Violence.
Law Project against Labour Violence.
Law Project to modify Commercial Loyalty law. Sanctioned November 29 of 2006. Promulgated by the National Executive Power on December 19 of 2006. Law nº 26.179.
Law Project to transfer, free of charge, a real estate national property Marcos Juarez Council in the Province of Córdoba. Sanctioned by the National Congress with number 26.201. Promulgated by the National Executive Power January 9, 2007.
Law Project regarding Tattoos and other Body Techniques.
Law Project Against Crime of Slave Trade and for an Information and Protection System for the Victim.
Law Project regarding the Application of Assisted Human Reproduction.
Law Project for the Regulation of Tobacco-derived Products' Commercialization and to Control the effect of active and passive consumption on human health.
Law Project to designate the year 2008 as “Year of the Fight Against Domestic Violence” in the Argentine Republic.

External links
Senate profile
Senate Personal Web Page

Living people
Justicialist Party politicians
Members of the Argentine Senate for Córdoba
People from General Pico
Argentine women physicians
21st-century Argentine women politicians
21st-century Argentine politicians
1952 births